Oséas Reis dos Santos (born May 14, 1971 in Salvador, Bahia, Brazil), known as Oséas, is a retired Brazilian football player.

Club statistics

National team statistics

Honors

Team
 Copa Libertadores Winner: 1999
 Intercontinental Cup Runners-up: 1999

Individual
 Brazilian 2nd Division League Top Scorer: 1995

External links

1971 births
Living people
Brazilian footballers
Brazilian expatriate footballers
Club Athletico Paranaense players
Sociedade Esportiva Palmeiras players
Cruzeiro Esporte Clube players
Santos FC players
Sport Club Internacional players
Brasiliense Futebol Clube players
Expatriate footballers in Japan
J1 League players
Vissel Kobe players
Albirex Niigata players
Copa Libertadores-winning players
Brazil international footballers
Campeonato Brasileiro Série A players
Association football forwards
Sportspeople from Salvador, Bahia